10:04 is the second novel by the American writer Ben Lerner.


Description
The novel belongs to the genres of autofiction and metafiction. The first-person narrator is a 33-year-old writer who lives in New York City. A successful novelist, he has recently been diagnosed with a heart condition that could prove fatal. The book deals with love, art, city, illness, having children, and writing.

Reception
The critical reception of 10:04 has been largely positive.

Awards
The novel was shortlisted for the 2014 Folio Prize.

References

External links
Review by Hari Kunzru in The New York Times
Review by Catherine O'Flynn in The Guardian
Review by Jonathan Gibbs in The Independent

2014 American novels
Novels set in New York City
Farrar, Straus and Giroux books
English-language novels
McClelland & Stewart books
Granta Books books
Novels about writers